Australian Legislative Council may refer to:

 South Australian Legislative Council, the upper house of the Parliament of South Australia
 Western Australian Legislative Council, the upper house of parliament in the Australian state of Western Australia
 New South Wales Legislative Council, the upper house of parliament in the Australian state of New South Wales
 Tasmanian Legislative Council, the upper house of parliament in the Australian state of Tasmania
 Queensland Legislative Council, the former upper house of parliament in the Australian state of Queensland, abolished 1922
 Victorian Legislative Council, the upper house of parliament in the Australian state of Victoria